The Japan X Bowl (previously the Japan Super Bowl) was the annual championship game of the X-League, the highest level of professional American football in Japan.

Japan X Bowl (1987-present)

Japan X Bowl appearances by team

References

External links
Japan X Bowl homepage

American football bowls
American football in Japan
1987 establishments in Japan
Recurring sporting events established in 1987